Abezhdan (also Romanized as Ābezhdān; also known as Ābeshdūn-e ‘Olyā) is a village in Abolfares Rural District, in the Central District of Ramhormoz County, Khuzestan Province, Iran. At the 2006 census, its population was 191, in 39 families.

References 

Populated places in Ramhormoz County